Ambroise Dubois (1542/43–1614/15) was a Flemish-born French painter.

Dubois was born in Antwerp and became a painter of the second School of Fontainebleau. His influences were Niccolò dell'Abbate and Francesco Primaticcio. Dubois painted primarily portraits and mythological scenes. Dubreuil was painter to Marie de Médicis in 1606, decorating the Queen's Cabinet with episodes from Tancred and Clorinda.

Dubois died in Fontainebleau.

References

1540s births
1610s deaths
16th-century Flemish painters
16th-century French painters
French male painters
17th-century French painters
Flemish Mannerist painters
Artists from Antwerp
French Mannerist painters